Plumas Eureka is a census-designated place (CDP) in Plumas County, California, United States. The population was 320 at the 2000 census.

Geography
Plumas Eureka is located at  (39.789608, -120.651553).

According to the United States Census Bureau, the CDP has a total area of 4.0 square miles (10.3 km), all of it land.

Demographics

2010
At the 2010 census, Plumas Eureka had a population of 339. The racial makeup of Plumas Eureka was 326 (96.2%) White, 0 (0.0%) African American, 1 (0.3%) Native American, 3 (0.9%) Asian, 0 (0.0%) Pacific Islander, 3 (0.9%) from other races, and 6 (1.8%) from two or more races. Hispanic or Latino of any race were 17 people (5.0%).

The whole population lived in households; no one lived in non-institutionalized group quarters and no one was institutionalized.

There were 167 households, of which 19 (11.4%) had children under the age of 18 living in them, 105 (62.9%) were opposite-sex married couples living together, 7 (4.2%) had a female householder with no husband present, and 1 (0.6%) had a male householder with no wife present.  There were 11 (6.6%) unmarried opposite-sex partnerships, and 0 (0%) same-sex married couples or partnerships. 42 households (25.1%) were one person and 26 (15.6%) had someone living alone who was 65 or older. The average household size was 2.03.  There were 113 families (67.7% of households); the average family size was 2.38.

The age distribution was 34 people (10.0%) under the age of 18, 13 people (3.8%) aged 18 to 24, 43 people (12.7%) aged 25 to 44, 140 people (41.3%) aged 45 to 64, and 109 people (32.2%) who were 65 or older.  The median age was 59.0 years. For every 100 females, there were 94.8 males.  For every 100 females age 18 and over, there were 100.7 males.

There were 523 housing units at an average density of 131.4 per square mile, of the occupied units 136 (81.4%) were owner-occupied and 31 (18.6%) were rented. The homeowner vacancy rate was 13.8%; the rental vacancy rate was 50.0%.  267 people (78.8% of the population) lived in owner-occupied housing units and 72 people (21.2%) lived in rental housing units.

2000
At the 2000 census, there were 320 people, 167 households, and 110 families in the CDP. The racial makeup of the CDP was 99.06% White, 0.31% Asian, and 0.62% from two or more races. Hispanic or Latino of any race were 1.25%.

Of the 167 households, 9.6% had children under the age of 18 living with them, 64.1% were married couples living together, 1.2% had a female householder with no husband present, and 34.1% were non-families. 29.3% of households were one person and 13.2% were one person aged 65 or older.  The average household size was 1.92 and the average family size was 2.31.

The age distribution was 10.0% under the age of 18, 0.6% from 18 to 24, 13.1% from 25 to 44, 45.6% from 45 to 64, and 30.6% 65 or older.  The median age was 56 years. For every 100 females, there were 82.9 males.  For every 100 females age 18 and over, there were 84.6 males.

The median household income was $58,571 and the median family income  was $59,643. Males had a median income of $54,286 versus $46,250 for females. The per capita income for the CDP was $30,706.  None of the families and 4.9% of the population were living below the poverty line, including no under eighteens and 5.4% of those over 64.

Politics

References

Census-designated places in Plumas County, California
Census-designated places in California